is a former Japanese football player.

Playing career
Yuki Abe played for FC Kariya, Saurcos Fukui and Grulla Morioka from 2012 to 2015.

References

External links

1989 births
Living people
Sanno Institute of Management alumni
Association football people from Tokyo
Japanese footballers
J3 League players
FC Kariya players
Iwate Grulla Morioka players
Association football forwards